Rakvere Parish is a rural municipality of Estonia, in Lääne-Viru County. Rakvere municipality surrounds the city of Rakvere and is located in north east Estonia. The shape of the municipality resembles to a butterfly. Rakvere Parish is one of the smallest local governments in Estonia in terms of population, being the 54th largest local government (in Estonia is 79 local governments).

Settlements

Rakvere Parish has 4 small boroughs and 47 villages.
Small borough
Lepna, Näpi, Sõmeru and Uhtna.
Villages
Aluvere, Andja, Aresi, Arkna, Eesküla, Järni, Jäätma, Kaarli, Karitsa, Karivärava, Karunga, Katela, Katku, Kloodi, Kohala, Kohala-Eesküla, Koovälja, Kullaaru, Kõrgemäe, Lasila, Levala, Muru, Mädapea, Nurme, Paatna, Papiaru, Päide, Rahkla, Raudlepa, Raudvere, Roodevälja, Rägavere, Sooaluse, Sämi, Sämi-Tagaküla, Taaravainu, Tobia, Toomla, Tõrma, Tõrremäe, Ubja, Ussimäe, Vaeküla, Varudi-Altküla, Varudi-Vanaküla, Veltsi and Võhma.

Religion

Geography 
Rakvere Parish is a parish with diverse landscape and landforms. There are karst areas, karst rivers and beautiful natural stands. Two rivers - Selja and Kunda - passes through municipality. In the municipality is lake Päide.

Transport 
Tallinn-Narva highway passes the municipality. This highway is part of the European route E20. The Tallinn-Narva railway passes also the municipality but closest train station is in Rakvere. By bus is also best connection with Rakvere.

Closest port that is cargo port is in Kunda.

Main landmarks 
In the municipality is 8 manors that are mostly privately owned: Rägavere, Vaeküla, Uhtna, Kohala, Arkna, Mädapea, Lasila, Kloodi.

References

This article includes content from the Estonian Wikipedia article Rakvere vald.

External links